Jakub Skorupa (24 June 2000) was a Polish Soccer Player who played for the Saint Louis College of Pharmacy and University of Health Sciences and Pharmacy in St. Louis soccer programs.

Career

Youth and college 
Growing up he was given the nickname "Leszek" to honor his grandfather's friend from Poland who fought with him in the Polish Military. Skorupa played for local club AAC Eagles and played at Maine South High School. After graduating, Skorupa committed to play soccer in Saint Louis at the NAIA level.
 
Skorupa was a member of the Saint Louis College of Pharmacy and University of Health Sciences and Pharmacy in St. Louis Soccer teams that competed in the NAIA from 2018 to 2022. As a forward, he scored 4 goals and had 3 assists throughout his career. Skorupa currently has the conference records for 2nd most goals in a conference tournament match, most goals per game in conference tournament history, and holds the 2nd most points ever in a conference tournament. Led the soccer team to overhaul the program from one of the worst at the NAIA level to a mid-tier NAIA program. Lead the team in points and scoring in Junior and Senior seasons. Most goals per game ever in the AMC tournament and most goals in AMC tournament in UHSP Soccer Program history. As a Senior, Skorupa was awarded the UHSP Eutectic Program Player of the Year by his coach and teammates.

Honors 
 AMC Conference All-Academic Squad: 2019
 AMC Conference All-Academic Squad: 2020
 AMC Conference All-Academic Squad: 2021
 AMC Team Fair Play and Sportsmanship Team Award: 2020
 AMC Team Fair Play and Sportsmanship Team Award: 2021    
 UHSP Eutectic Program Player of the Year: 2021

References